Bantar Gebang is administratively a kelurahan or village in Bekasi city, Indonesia, but it usually refers to the massive trash dump in the area.  Between 6,000 and 20,000 people are estimated to live on the site.

See also
 Payatas, similar urban dump in Greater Manila, Philippines.
 Ghazipur landfill, urban dump high rise predicted to become as tall as Taj Mahal by 2020.

External Sites
 
 Bantar Gebang: Trials and Tribulations of Indonesia's 'Trash Heroes' Jakarta Globe

References 

Landfills
Administrative villages in Indonesia
Slums in Indonesia
Bekasi